State elections were held in South Australia on 10 February 1912. All 40 seats in the South Australian House of Assembly were up for election. The incumbent United Labor Party government led by Premier of South Australia John Verran was defeated by the opposition Liberal Union led by  Leader of the Opposition Archibald Peake. Each of the 13 districts elected multiple members, with voters casting multiple votes.

See also
 Members of the South Australian House of Assembly, 1912-1915
 Members of the South Australian Legislative Council, 1912–1915

References
History of South Australian elections 1857-2006, volume 1: ECSA
State and federal election results in Australia since 1890

External links
The 13 electorates from 1902 to 1915: The Adelaide Chronicle

Elections in South Australia
1912 elections in Australia
1910s in South Australia
February 1912 events